Madeleine Pape (born 24 February 1984) is an Australian sociologist and former middle-distance athlete.

Athletic career
Pape grew up in Emerald, Victoria and was inspired to focus on running after seeing local athletes represent Australia in the 2006 Commonwealth Games. In 2008, she set a personal best of 1:59.92 in the 800 metres while winning the Sydney Athletics Grand Prix. Pape competed in the women's 800 metres at the 2008 Summer Olympics in Beijing, where she finished her heat in sixth place, failing to advance to the semi-finals. Pape went on to win an 800m gold medal at the 2009 Summer Universiade in Belgrade, finishing in 2:01.91. However, in 2010, she had a tendon injury that ended her athletics career.

Academic career 
In 2011, Pape completed a B.A. with honours, majoring in sociology, at Monash University. She then moved to the United States, where she earned a M.S. and Ph.D. in sociology at the University of Wisconsin–Madison. Her doctoral thesis examined sex and gender in sport and biomedicine. In 2020, Pape joined the University of Lausanne as a postdoctoral fellow.

References

External links

Profile – Australian Olympic Team
NBC 2008 Olympics profile

Australian female middle-distance runners
Living people
Olympic athletes of Australia
Athletes (track and field) at the 2008 Summer Olympics
Athletes from Melbourne
1984 births
World Athletics Championships athletes for Australia
Universiade medalists in athletics (track and field)
Universiade gold medalists for Australia
Medalists at the 2009 Summer Universiade
Australian women social scientists
Australian sociologists
Australian women sociologists
Monash University alumni
University of Wisconsin–Madison College of Letters and Science alumni
21st-century Australian women
20th-century Australian women
People from Cardinia